William Knudsen may refer to:
 William S. Knudsen, Danish-American automotive industry executive and U.S. Army general 
 William Ross Knudsen, American socialist political activist and trade union organizer